Thomas Ignatius McCarthy, LRIBA (born 31 January 1880, died 13 Feb 1951) was an architect based in Coalville, Leicestershire.

Early in the twentieth century, Thomas Ignatius McCarthy set up a practice as a surveyor and architect in Coalville, which was a partnership shared with Henry Collings (1880 - 1960). Collings was responsible for the design of the Coalville Clock Tower war memorial - a building admired by Pevsner.

Examples of work by Thomas Ignatius McCarthy (some possibly in conjunction with Henry Collings):

Primitive Methodist Church, Marlborough Square, Coalville - 1903
Holy Cross Roman Catholic Church, Parsonwood Hill, Whitwick - 1904
New Council School, Coalville - 1907
Nottingham and Nottinghamshire Bank, 19 High Road, Beeston, Nottinghamshire 1908.
Olympia Picture House, Coalville - 1910 (demolished 1933)
South Porch, Saint Andrew's Church, Thringstone - 1911
The Plaza Cinema, Silver Street, Whitwick - 1914 (destroyed by fire, 1982)
Hosiery Factory, North Street, Whitwick - 1914 (demolished c 2005)
Working Men's Co-operative Society, Belvoir Road, Coalvile - 1915
Extensions to Mowsley Sanatorium - 1918
Hinckley Isolation Hospital, Ashby Road, tuberculosis pavilion - 1924
County Sanatorium and Isolation Hospital, Ratby Lane, Markfield - 1932. 
Our Lady of the Angels Roman Catholic Church, (additions) Nuneaton - 1936

References

1880 births
1951 deaths
20th-century English architects
People from Coalville
Architects from Leicestershire